Oana Dariana Pellea (born 29 January 1962) is a Romanian actress, the daughter of actor Amza Pellea.

Selected filmography

Honours
Order of the Star of Romania, Officer rank (December 1, 2000).
  Romanian Royal Family: 74th Knight of the Royal Decoration of the Cross of the Romanian Royal House

References

External links
 

1962 births
Living people
Actresses from Bucharest
Romanian film actresses
Officers of the Order of the Star of Romania